Christoph Eichhorn (born 8 September 1957, in Kassel, West Germany) is a German television actor and director.

Life 
He is the son of German actor Werner Eichhorn. From 1972 to 1977 Eichhorn worked as actor at Schauspielhaus Bochum. As film actor he played in various films. In February 2021, Eichhorn came out as gay.

Selected filmography

Actor 
 1973: The Tenderness of Wolves
 1979:  (TV miniseries)
 1979: Neonschatten (TV film)
 1980: Kaiserhofstraße 12 (TV film)
 1980:  (TV film)
 1981: Exil (TV miniseries)
 1982: Die Chance (Short)
 1982: The Magic Mountain
 1983: 
 1985: Westler
 1985: Die Frau mit den Karfunkelsteinen (TV film)
 1986: Peter the Great (TV miniseries)
 1987: 
 1988: 
 1989: Joan of Arc of Mongolia
 1989: The Dancing Girl (舞姫)
 1989: Hard Days, Hard Nights
 1990: The Plot to Kill Hitler
 1991:  (TV film)
 1991:  (TV film)
 1993: Just a Matter of Duty
 1993: 
 1994: Tödliches Erbe (TV film)
 1995: Großstadtrevier (TV series, 4 episodes)
 1996: The Secret of Sagal (TV series)
 1985–1995: Derrick  (TV series, 8 episodes)
 1978–1996: The Old Fox (TV series, 6 episodes)
 2000: Escape to Life: The Erika and Klaus Mann Story

Director 
 1982: Die Chance
 1988: Der Weg zum Ruhm
 1989: Jenseits von Blau
 1995: Der Mann auf der Bettkante
 1996: Alarm für Cobra 11 – Die Autobahnpolizei (TV series)
 1998: Im Namen des Gesetzes (TV series)
 2001: Die Kumpel (TV series)
 2002: Denninger – Der Mallorcakrimi (TV series)
 2002–2003: Balko (TV series)
 2007–2010: Ein Fall für Zwei (TV series)
 2007–2010: Krimi.de/Erfurt (TV series)
 2007–2009: Leipzig Homicide (TV series)
 2010: Stuttgart Homicide (TV series)
 2010: Cologne P.D. (TV series)

External links
 
 Director Christoph Eichhorn about "Krimi.de/Erfurt" (TV series). Interview (deutsch).
 http://christopheichhorn-kino.com Unofficial Website (rus-de).

References 

1957 births
Living people
German male television actors
20th-century German male actors
Mass media people from Kassel
German gay actors
Actors from Kassel
21st-century LGBT people